The Kairuku Rural LLG is a local level government area situated in the Kairuku-Hiri District of the Central Province of Papua New Guinea. In 2000, the LLG had 3,485 households, and a population of 19,503 (10,273 men and 9,230 women). As of 2007, 3,078 students are enrolled in 20 schools in the LLG. The area is divided into 17 wards, and spreads along the coast on either side of the Hiritano Highway leading north-west from the national capital, Port Moresby.

The coastline is relatively flat with thick vegetation, consisting mainly of savannah grassland, mangroves and eucalyptus trees. A significant portion of the land is mountainous, and is wooded with dense rainforest containing a variety of flora and fauna and numerous tree species such as beech, oak, pine and kwila.

Wards
Wards are:

01. Kivori
02. Waima Abiara
03. Waima/Kore
04. Delena
05. Nabuapaka
06. Chiria
07. Abiara
08. Biotou
09. Rapa
10. Mou
11. Babiko
13. Nara
14. Hisiu
15. Gabadi/Pinu
16. Malati
17. Veimauri
82. Bereina Urban

Towns and villages

See also
 Local-level governments of Papua New Guinea

References

External links
 Official site

Local-level governments of Central Province (Papua New Guinea)